The Fully Down was a Canadian rock band that was formed in Ottawa, Ontario in 1999, with the touring lineup coming together in 2003.

History
The band's original lineup recorded; but never released a record titled The Way of the Fully Down.

No Fate... But What We Make for Ourselves (2004) 

The band released the album No Fate... But What We Make for Ourselves in June 2004 on Ottawa's Pop Culture Records and they went directly on three weeks of the Vans Warped Tour 2004 in support of it. The band also toured to promote the record extensively throughout the east coast Provinces of Canada, Quebec and Southern Ontario. The record was also later released in Japan on Bullion Records.

Don't Get Lost In A Movement (2005-2006) 
The Fully Down signed to Fearless Records (Culver City, California) in August 2005. Their Fearless Records debut, Don't Get Lost In A Movement was released throughout North America on November 22, 2005. The band headed directly to the United States for a countrywide tour in support of the record with Four Year Strong (Worcester, Massachusetts) and Maida.

The following spring, the band headed out across Canada on Tour and Loathing headlined by Protest The Hero and including A Wilhelm Scream, Bayside and The Spill Canvas. The tour ended halfway through April, and they began touring with Boy Sets Fire (Newark, Delaware) and Versus the Mirror until the end of May. The summer of 2006 was spent back on the Vans Warped Tour; as the band played all 50 dates on the Smartpunk stage.

In late 2006, the band appeared on the Radio Rebellion Tour in support of Norma Jean (Douglasville, Georgia), Between the Buried and Me, Fear Before the March of Flames and Misery Signals. In December they flew to Japan in support of Bodyjar, Bigwig and FACT (Ibaraki Prefecture, Japan) starting in Osaka and finishing up in Tokyo.

In December 2006, vocalist Gab Bouchard announced that he was leaving the band. He played his last show on December 27, at The Salt Lounge in London, Ontario.

The Fully Down announced Justin Camarena, of Tough Call (Detroit, MI) would be taking on Lead Vocals after a six-month hiatus. Camarena was a founding member of the punk rock band Tough Call, which had a loyal following from their inception in 2003 until they disbanded following Justin's departure to join The Fully Down. During that time they recorded over forty songs for their next record of which a few demos where posted on Myspace and Purevolume.

Breakup and final concert
On July 30, 2008 the band posted a blog entry on their Myspace page announcing that they were breaking up, with their final show occurring at Zaphod Beeblebrox in Ottawa on August 23, 2008.

2008-present
Since then, a few of the band members have started other projects. Dan Hay (guitar) joined Ottawa band Amos the Transparent, Alex Newman (bass) moved to London, Ontario to start his new band, The Bad Ideas but has since moved back to Ottawa, Ontario.

Lineup
Richard Latour - drums
Alex Newman - bass
George Hadji - guitar
Dan Hay - guitar
Kris Parks - guitar
Justin Camarena - vocals

Former members
Gab Bouchard - vocals (2003–2006)
Joe Brownrigg - vocals, guitar (1999–2002)
Dustin Wenzel - drums, backup vocals (1999-2002) 
Aaron Libbey - vocals (2002)

Discography

Tour dates

References

External links
Official Myspace

Musical groups established in 1999
Musical groups disestablished in 2008
Canadian punk rock groups
Musical groups from Ottawa
Fearless Records artists
1999 establishments in Ontario
2008 disestablishments in Ontario